Uerikon railway station is a railway station in Switzerland, situated near the village of Uerikon in the municipality of Stäfa. The station is located on the Lake Zurich right-bank line. Uerikon station was also the junction for the former Uerikon–Bauma railway (UeBB), which between 1901 and 1948 linked Uerikon with Hombrechtikon, Bubikon, Hinwil, Bäretswil and Bauma.

Services 
 the following services stop at Uerikon:

 Zürich S-Bahn:

References

External links 
 
 

Uerikon
Uerikon
Stäfa